This is a list of major urban conflagrations. Before the 20th century, fires were a major hazard to urban areas and the cause of massive amounts of damage to cities.

For notable fires that involved a single structure, see list of building or structure fires.  Other lists record wildfires (including forest fires) and transportation fires, though those that caused significant urban damage also appear on that list.

Antiquity to Middle Ages

 587 BCThe destruction of the Temple and city of Jerusalem
 330 BCPersepolis destroyed by fire after its capture by Alexander the Great.
 146 BCCarthage was systematically burned down over 17 days by the Romans at the end of the Third Punic War
 64Great Fire of Rome, Italy
 79Lyon burned to ashes.
 406A great fire burns down much of Constantinople.
 532The Nika riots result in the destruction of much of Constantinople by fire.
 798London nearly destroyed.
 847Borgo, Italy, the area around Saint Peter's Basilica in Rome, was devastated by fire.
 1041Fire destroys most of the old city of Bremen, Germany, including the cathedral.
 1046A fire in Hildesheim, Germany, destroys parts of the city, including the cathedral.
 1132In June, a huge fire in Hangzhou, China, destroyed 13,000 houses.
 1135Great Medieval London Fire of 1135. The first of the two Great Medieval Fires of London. This blaze was so severe that it destroyed most of the city between St Paul's and St Clement Danes in Westminster.
 1137A Great Fire in Hangzhou, China, destroyed 10,000 houses.
 1157First Fire of Lübeck, Germany, destroys the city.
 1204Sack of Constantinople (1204). Constantinople was burned three times during the Fourth Crusade.
 1212the Great Fire of Suthwark London 1212. The second of the two Great Medieval Fires of London. As many as 3,000 people died on the London Bridge while trying to flee the city.
 1251Second Fire of Lübeck, Germany, triggers the use of stone as a fire-safe building material.
 1253Great Fire of Utrecht, the Netherlands, lasted for 9 days and destroyed much of the city.
 1276Third Fire of Lübeck, Germany, results in a comprehensive fire safety system. This was the last major fire in the city before bombing of WW II.
 1327Fire of Munich, Germany, destroys one-third of the city, 30 deaths.
 1405Fire of Bern, Switzerland, destroys 600 houses, over 100 deaths.
 1421First Great Fire of Amsterdam, the Netherlands.
 1438Great Fire of Gouda, the Netherlands, almost destroys the entire city.
 1452Second Great Fire of Amsterdam, the Netherlands, destroys three-quarters of the city.

16th century

 1544Burning of Edinburgh  - An English amphibious raid destroyed portions of the city and many surrounding villages.
 1547The 1547 Moscow fire sparked a rebellion.
 1571The 1571 Moscow fire occurred when the forces of the Crimean khan Devlet I Giray raided the city.

17th century
 1608First settlement in Jamestown, New York burnt.
 1615Great Fire of Wymondham, Norfolk, England, two simultaneous fires destroyed 300 properties.
 1624Oslo, Norway, destroyed by fire.
 1625First Great Stockholm Fire, Sweden, burned for three days and destroyed a fifth of the infrastructure.
 1652 Glasgow, Scotland, a third of the city destroyed and over 1,000 families left homeless.
 1653Great Fire of Marlborough, England, destroyed the Guildhall, St Mary's Church, the County Armoury, and 224 dwellings.
 1656Fire of Aachen destroys 4,664 houses, kills 17.
 1657Great Fire of Meireki destroys two-thirds of the Japanese capital Edo (modern-day Tokyo).
 1660Fire in Istanbul, Turkey, destroys two-thirds of the city and kills an estimated 40,000 people.
 1663Great Fire of Nagasaki destroys the port of Nagasaki in Japan.

 1666Great Fire of London of 1666, which originated in a baker's shop on Pudding Lane and destroyed much of London.
 1675Great Fire of Northampton, England. The blaze was caused by sparks from an open fire in St. Mary's Street near Northampton castle. In 6 hours it devastated the town centre, destroying about 600 buildings (three-quarters of the town) including All Saints church. 11 people died and about 700 families were made homeless.
 1676Jamestown, Virginia was burned by Nathaniel Bacon and his followers during Bacon's Rebellion to prevent Governor Berkley from using it as a base.
 1677Fire of Rostock, Germany, destroys 700 houses and accelerates the city's economic decline at the end of the Hanseatic period.
 1678Hardegsen. Germany, experienced a fire during the Christmas fair that destroyed most of the town centre. There were no injuries as people were in church.
 1684Toompea (part of modern Tallinn), a fire destroyed most of the hilltop-town.
 1689Fire of Skopje of 1689, present-day capital of North Macedonia is burned.
 1692Two-thirds of Usingen, Germany, is razed, later replaced by a baroque town centre.
 1694Great Fire of Warwick, England
 1696St. John's, Newfoundland, and 35 other settlements were burned by French forces under Pierre Le Moyne d'Iberville.

18th century

 1702Uppsala, Sweden, devastated in large part and the cathedral and Uppsala Castle severely damaged.
 1702Bergen, at the time the largest city in Norway, seven-eighths destroyed during a storm.
 1707Xàtiva, the second most important city in the former Kingdom of Valencia, was burnt down as an exemplary punishment by the Bourbon king Philip V of Spain after besieging and conquering it.
 1711Great Boston Fire of 1711. Destroyed the First Town-House
 1726Reutlingen, Germany, Free Imperial City, 80% of all residential houses and almost all public buildings destroyed, making 1,200 families homeless.
 1728Copenhagen Fire of 1728, Denmark, two-fifths of the city burned down during three days. 3,650 families became homeless.
 1731Blandford Forum, Dorset, England, a large majority of the town was destroyed on 4 June. The aftermath of this fire had an Act of Parliament passed stating that rebuilding work must be in brick and tile.
 1731Tiverton fire, Devon, England, burned nearly 300 houses.
 1734Montreal, New France
 1752Fire destroys 18,000 houses in Moscow, 5–6 May.
 1754The Great Fire of Hindon swept through the village of Hindon, Wiltshire, burning 144 houses and buildings to the ground.
 1759The Second Great Stockholm Fire  (Swedish: Mariabranden meaning brand = fire) in Södermalm, Stockholm, Sweden, destroyed about 300 buildings.
 1760  Fire in the town of Porvoo, Finland (then part of Sweden) burned down most of the settlement on June 11. Propagated by long drought and strong wind.
 1760Great Boston Fire of 1760, 349 buildings destroyed
 1775Great Fire of Tartu, Estonia, nearly 200 buildings destroyed

 1776First Great Fire of New York City of 1776
 1776Around two-thirds of Varaždin, the capital of Croatia at the time, destroyed in a fire of unknown origin.
 1787Great Boston Fire of 1787. 100 buildings destroyed in the southern part of Boston.
 1788First Great New Orleans Fire of 1788, 856 out of 1,100 structures burned.
 1788Great Fire of Tenmei, Kyoto, Japan, 150 killed, 37,000 houses burned, on March 6.
 1793Cap Français (modern-day Cap-Haïtien, Haiti).
 1794Second Great New Orleans Fire of 1794, 212 structures destroyed.
 1795Copenhagen fire of 1795

19th century

1800s 

 1805Great Fire of 1805: Detroit, Michigan Territory, then a wooden frontier settlement, burned except for a river warehouse.
 1807The Second Battle of Copenhagen led to the burning of over a thousand buildings in the city, including the Church of Our Lady.

1810s 

 1811Great Fire of Podil in Kiev, Russian Empire. Over 2,000 buildings, 12 churches and 3 abbeys destroyed; about 30 deaths.
 1812The Fire of Moscow of 1812 was burned to deny shelter to Napoleon.
 1812–1814The War of 1812 involved several major urban fires:
 1813Buffalo, New York
 1813York, Upper Canada
 1814Burning of Washington
 1813Portsmouth, New Hampshire
 1814Great fire of Tirschenreuth in Tirschenreuth, Bavaria, totally destroys the town apart from the parish church and 3 neighboring buildings.
 1817St. John's, Newfoundland

1820s 

 1820Ponce, Puerto Rico, a Spanish settlement, was almost completely destroyed on February 27.<ref name="Ponce. 1913. Page 194">''Verdadera y Auténtica Historia de la Ciudad de Ponce. By Dr. Eduardo Neumann. 1913. (In Spanish) Reprinted by the Instituto de Cultura Puertorriqueña (1987)Page 194.</ref>
 1820Great Savannah Fire burned almost 500 structures, with damages of about  million.
 1821Paramaribo, Suriname, fire destroyed over 400 houses.
 1821Great Fire of Fayetteville destroyed 500 buildings in the city.
 1827Great Fire of Turku, Finland
 1829Fire destroyed hundreds of buildings in Augusta, Georgia.

 1830s 
 1831A fire in Fayetteville, North Carolina destroyed hundreds of buildings, and almost completely leveled the city.
 1835Second Great Fire of New York City of 1835 1838Charleston, South Carolina, over 1,000 buildings damaged.

 1840s 

 1842Hamburg fire, about a quarter of the inner city destroyed, 51 killed, and an estimated 20,000 homeless.

 1845Great New York City Fire of 1845, 345 buildings destroyed
 1845Great Fire of Pittsburgh destroyed over 1,000 buildings.
 1845A fire at La Playa, the city port of Ponce, Puerto Rico, wiped out most of the Ponce vicinity in March.
 1846Great Fire of 1846 in St. John's, Newfoundland, destroyed about 2,000 buildings and left 12,000 homeless.
 1847Great Fire of Bucharest, Romania.
 1848Fire in Medina, Ohio, destroyed the entire business district.
 1849St. Louis Fire of 1849, saw the first US firefighter killed in the line of duty.
 1849First Great Fire of Toronto of 1849 1850s 

 1850Kraków Fire of 1850, Poland, affects 10% of the city area.
 1851San Francisco Fire of 1851 destroys 2,000 buildings.
 1852Vaasa, Finland
 1852Great Montreal Fire of 1852 in Montreal left 10,000 of the city's 57,000 residents homeless.
 1854The Great fire of Newcastle and Gateshead, England, started by a spectacular explosion, killed 53 and leveled substantial property in both towns.
 1858A large fire in Auckland, New Zealand, destroyed 3 hotels, 20 shops, more than 50 houses, the police station, theater, post office and several other buildings in the centre of town, an entire city block. At the time Auckland had a population of about 6,300.

 1860s 

 1862Troy, New York, 671 buildings destroyed
 1864Great Fire of Brisbane in Queensland, Australia, burned over four city blocks with over 50 houses and dozens of businesses razed
 1861–1865The American Civil War involved several major city fires:
 1861Charleston, South Carolina
 1864Atlanta, Georgia, burned after time given for evacuation of citizens by order of William Tecumseh Sherman
 1865Columbia, South Carolina, burned while being occupied by troops commanded by William Tecumseh Sherman
 1865Richmond, Virginia, burned by retreating Confederates.
 1866Great Portland Fire of 1866, Maine, destroyed the commercial district and left 10,000 homeless.
 1868Auerbach in der Oberpfalz, Bavaria. Arson destroyed 107 houses and 146 other buildings; 4 deaths.
 1869Great Fire of Whitstable of 1869, Kent, England, fed by strong winds, destroying 71 buildings.

 1870s 

 1870Fire in Medina, Ohio, started in a wooden building with a barber shop and consumed all but two blocks of the business district, nearly wiping out the entire town.
 1871Fires deliberately set during the Paris Commune in May destroyed the Royal Palace of the Tuileries, the Louvre Library, the Palais de Justice, the Hôtel de Ville, the Gare de Lyon, and the Palais d'Orsay.
 1871Strong winds fed several simultaneous fires in Wisconsin, Michigan and Illinois on October 8–9:
 1871Great Chicago Fire of 1871 destroyed the downtown on October 8 and died out the following night. About 250 dead.
 1871Peshtigo Fire of 1871, several towns destroyed in a firestorm that reached Michigan, 1,500–2,500 dead. Deadliest wildfire in American history.
 1871Great Michigan Fire of 1871 was a series of simultaneous fires, the most prominent of which was the Port Huron Fire, which killed over 200 people in Port Huron, Michigan.
 1871The Urbana fire destroyed central Urbana, Illinois, on October 9.
 1872Great Boston Fire of 1872, destroyed 776 buildings and killed at least 20 people.
 1874Chicago Fire of 1874, July 14, was in some respects very similar to the 1871 fire, but was stopped by a new fire-proof wall. It destroyed 812 structures and killed 20 people.
 1875Great Whiskey Fire, Dublin, 18 June, killed 13 people, and destroyed a malt house, a bonded warehouse, houses and a tannery in Mill Street and Chamber Street.
 1877 – Paris, Texas, the first of three fires that destroyed much of the town.
 1877Saint John, New Brunswick, fire destroyed 1,600 buildings.
 1879Hakodate fire, Hakodate, Hokkaidō, Japan, caused 67 fatalities, 20,000 homeless.

 1880s 
 1880On 25 September, another fire took place destroying most of the older civil records (births, baptisms, marriages, etc.) of the Ponce, Puerto Rico, parish. 
 1881Thumb Fire in Michigan burned over a million acres during a drought, 282 killed.
 1883In mid August, a Great Fire broke out in Kuala Terengganu, Terengganu, destroying the royal palace and 1,600 buildings, many housing gunpowder.
 1886Fire in Calgary, Alberta
 1886Great Vancouver Fire, Vancouver, British Columbia
 1888Sundsvall Fire of 1888, Sweden, left 9,000 homeless.
 1889Great Seattle Fire, Washington, destroyed the central business district
 1889Great Spokane Fire, Washington, destroyed the downtown commercial district.
 1889Great Ellensburg Fire, Washington, resulted in the city's bid to become the state capital ending in failure.
 1889Great Bakersfield Fire of 1889, California, destroyed 196 buildings and killed 1 person.
 1889The First Great Fire of Lynn, Massachusetts, destroyed about 100 buildings and took over 2 weeks to put out.

 1890s 

 1892Great Fire of 1892 in St. John's, Newfoundland 1893Clarksville, Virginia, fire destroyed many of the blocks between the river (now the Kerr Reservoir) and 5th Street in the historic commercial core.
 1894Great Hinckley Fire, Minnesota was a firestorm that destroyed several towns; over 400 killed.
 1894Great Fire in Shanghai destroyed over 1,000 buildings.
 1896 – Paris, Texas, the second of three fires that destroyed much of the town.
 1897The Great Fire of Windsor, Nova Scotia, Canada, destroyed 80% of the town.
 1898Great Fire of New Westminster, British Columbia
 1898Great fire of Park City, Utah
 1899El Polvorin Fire in Ponce, Puerto Rico, occurred on January 25.  The fire started at the U.S. Munitions Depot (on the lot currently occupied by the Ponce High School). The heroes in that fire are remembered with monuments and an obelisk in Plaza Las Delicias.

 20th century 
 1900s 

 1900Hull–Ottawa Fire of 1900, Canada. Starting in Hull, Quebec, the fire crossed the river to Ottawa, Ontario, and destroyed large areas of both cities.
 1900Sandon, British Columbia, Canada, destroyed by fire.
 1901Great Jacksonville Fire of 1901 in Jacksonville, Florida, destroyed the downtown area with flames seen for hundreds of miles.
 1902The Great Conflagration of 1902, Paterson, New Jersey
 1904Great Baltimore Fire of 1904 1904Second Great Fire of Toronto of 1904 1904Yazoo City, Mississippi (USA) fire, 25 May, destroyed entire business district of ca. 125 buildings; US$2,000,000 in damages.
 1904Ålesund Fire, 850 buildings destroyed, c. 10,000 made homeless; the fire started during a violent storm.
 1906San Francisco earthquake and fire 1906Dundee Fire of 1906, Scotland, began at a whiskey warehouse with alcohol explosions spreading flames, several blocks burned.
 1907Hakodate, Hokkaido, Japan, a fire that broke out in the evening of August 25 burned for six hours, destroying an estimated 60–70% of the city, leaving 60,000+ homeless and causing at least 8,000,000 yen in property damage, including many of the city's historical buildings destroyed.
 1908First Great Chelsea Fire on April 12.  Nearly half the city of Chelsea, Massachusetts, was destroyed.
 1909Phoenix, British Columbia destroyed by fire, then rebuilt.

 1910s 

 1911Oscoda/AuSable, Michigan
 1911Great Fire of 1911 in Bangor, Maine, destroyed hundreds of buildings.
 1911Great Porcupine Fire in Porcupine, Ontario. Destroyed up to 494,000 acres of forest.
 1912Houston, Texas, 56 city blocks; Houston's largest fire
 1912Maryland Agricultural College, now the University of Maryland.
 1914Great Salem Fire of 1914, Massachusetts
 1916Bergen, Norway. About 300 buildings razed.
 1916Matheson Fire, Matheson, Ontario. Destroyed approximately 490,000 acres of land. 
 1916Paris, Texas Fire of 1916. Largest of 3 historical fires that destroyed most of the central business district and a large residential section. 
 1917The Halifax Explosion, the largest man-made explosion before the atomic bomb, sparked fires throughout Halifax, Nova Scotia.
 1917Great Atlanta fire of 1917, during which over 300 acres (1.2 km2, 73 blocks) were destroyed.
 1917Great Thessaloniki Fire of 1917, Thessaloniki, Greece. About 9,500 buildings were destroyed.
 1917 In Gyöngyös, Hungary, a fire destroyed a number of buildings, leaving around 8,000 people homeless.

 1920s 
 1920The Burning of Cork, Ireland, a fire set on December 11by the British Auxiliaries in revenge after an ambush by the IRA destroyed much of the old city centre of Cork.
 1921Tulsa Race Riot resulted in the destruction of 35 city blocks and 1,256 residences by arson.
1922 - The Fire of Manisa, Manisa, Turkey
 1922The Great Fire of Smyrna, Izmir, Turkey
 1922Most of downtown Astoria, Oregon burns
 1922The Great Fire of 1922 in the Timiskaming District, Ontario, Canada, killed 43 people and burnt down 18 townships.
 19231923 Tokyo fire following the Great Kantō earthquake razed half the city with over 100,000 deaths.
 19231923 Berkeley Fire, California, destroyed at least 640 structures.
 19251925 Decatur St. Fire, Atlanta, Georgia, left 6 firefighters dead, 8 others seriously injured.
 1928Great Fall River fire of 1928, Massachusetts

 1930s 

 1931Napier and Hastings, New Zealand. Fire engulfed much of these twin cities in the aftermath of the 1931 Hawke's Bay earthquake.
 1931Downtown fire in Marshfield, Wisconsin, killed 6 on March 28.
 1931Half of downtown Lillooet, British Columbia, Canada, was destroyed by fire.
 1934Hakodate, Hokkaido, a household fire began on March 21 and spread to the surrounding areas including a local court, department store, school and hospital. Over two days 2,166 people lost their lives, with 9,485 injured, 145,500 people made homeless, and 11,055 buildings lost.
 19381938 Changsha Fire, 56,000 buildings burned by the Chinese army during the Second Sino-Japanese War to prevent the Japanese from getting resources, 3,000 civilians killed.
 1939Luftwaffe Bombing of Warsaw on September 1, 1939, at the outbreak of World War II, left an estimated 1,500 killed.
 1939Great Lagunillas Fire at Ciudad Ojeda, Venezuela, on November 14.

 1940s 

 1940–1945Air raids during World War II resulted in many major city fires:
 1940Bombing of Rotterdam, 14 May, forcing the capitulation of the Dutch government. 800 killed, 24.000 houses destroyed, 80,000 left homeless.
 1940The Second Great Fire of London, one of the most-destructive air raids of The Blitz. 1,500 were killed.
 1942German air bombardment of Stalingrad, Soviet Union, resulting in firestorm and 955 fatalities (original Soviet estimate).
 1943Hamburg, 45,000 killed (largest in an air-raid on Germany)
 1943Kassel, 10,000 killed
 1944Braunschweig, 2,600 killed but 30,000 rescued
 1944Darmstadt, 12,000 killed
 1944Heilbronn, 6,500 killed
 1945Dresden, around 30,000 killed in firestorm during one of the most-controversial Allied air-raids.
 1945Pforzheim, a quarter of the town's population (17,000) killed.
 1945Hildesheim, 1,500 killed
 1945Tokyo, causing the largest urban conflagration in history, with over 100,000 killed.
 1945Würzburg, 5,000 killed
 1945Kobe, 8,800 killed
 1945Atomic bombings of Hiroshima and Nagasaki, 105,000 to 120,000 killed; large fires in each city.
 1941The great fire of Santander, Spain, destroyed the greater part of the medieval town centre.
 1944Destruction of Warsaw by the German army and Waffen SS, as a reprisal for the Warsaw Uprising, included the deliberate burning of many buildings.
 1946Bandung, a city in West Java, Indonesia, was burned on March 24 by Indonesians to prevent the Dutch from retaking the city, an event called "Bandung sea of fire".
 1947Texas City Disaster, two ships explode, igniting fires throughout the city and chemical works, 460–600 killed.
 1948Fukui earthquake with fire, 46,000 buildings and houses lost on June 28.
 1949A fire burned for 18 hours in Chongqing's waterfront and banking district, on September 2, killed 2,865 people and left more than 100,000 homeless. 7,000 buildings were destroyed.

 1950s 

 1953Shek Kip Mei fire in a squatter area in Hong Kong left 58,000 homeless.
 19541954 Iwanai Fire, an affective strong wind by Typhoon Marie in Hokkaido on 26 September, according to a Japan Fire and Disaster Management Agency official confirmed report, 38 persons perished, 551 persons were hurt, total 261.4 acres were lost.
 1955The Freeman Pier Fire in Seaside Heights & Seaside Park, New Jersey, United States.  At least 30 businesses lost, 50 residents evacuated, no major injuries.
 1956Franklin Street fire in New Haven, Connecticut, killed 15 on January 25.

 1960s 
 1961Bukit Ho Swee Fire, flames erupt in a squatter settlement in Singapore, making 16,000 homeless.
 1961Brentwood-Bel Air fire in Los Angeles, burned  and destroyed 484 homes.
 1963Fretz Building, Philadelphia, Pennsylvania, twelve-alarm fire was the largest in city history. 50 homes and multiple businesses destroyed along with original fire building.
 1964The Bellflower Street Conflagration in Boston destroyed 19 apartment buildings and damaged 11.
 1966Fire in Iloilo City, the Philippines, devastated most of the downtown area.

 1970s 

 1973Second Great Chelsea Fire on October 14 destroyed 18 city blocks.
 1974Chelsea, Massachusetts, a May 24 fire at the American Barrel Company spread to several other businesses in a two block area.

 1980s 

 1981Arson-initiated firestorm in Lynn, Massachusetts levelled downtown factory area under redevelopment. 
 1982Keane fire, Alberta, Canada, consumed more than 500,000 hectares of forest
 1982Village of Lopez, Sullivan County, Pennsylvania, United States, entire business district, including two hotels and the fire department leveled by a wind-whipped fire. It also sparked a 100 acre forest fire nearby.
 19831983 Buffalo propane explosion in Buffalo, New York kills five firefighters and two others and destroys millions in property.
 1983Dushore, Pennsylvania A fire destroyed two blocks of the historic business district, eight businesses and four homes. The fire was intentionally set.
 1984Oil spill set fire to the shantytown of Vila Socó, Cubatão, São Paulo, Brazil, on February 25; official death toll is 93 people although speculation is more than 200.
 1985MOVE incident in Philadelphia destroyed 65 houses on Osage Avenue and left 250 homeless.
 1985Annanar forest fire, Portugal, 1,500 km2 destroyed, killing 14.
 1986Chu Ku Tsai village fire, Hong Kong, left 2,000 homeless on Lunar New Year holiday.
 1986Aberdeen Typhoon Shelter fire, Aberdeen, Hong Kong, 150 vessels destroyed, 1,700 homeless and 2 injured on December 25.
 1988Great Lashio Fire, Lashio, Myanmar, killed 134 and destroyed 2,000 buildings.
 1988A fire in Lisbon, Portugal, destroyed 7 blocks of houses (7,500 m2) on August 25.
 1988The Perkasie, Pennsylvania, fire destroyed one and a half blocks of its historic downtown.

 1990s 

 1991Oakland Hills firestorm''' kills 25 and destroys 3,469 homes and apartments.
 1993 A tsunami and fires occurred at Okushiri Island, Japan, following the July 12 Hokkaidō earthquake, with 645 houses lost and 202 people killed.

 1995Great Hanshin earthquake with fire, Kobe, Japan

21st century

2000s 

 2001Terrorist attacks of September 11, 2001.  Of the initial casualties, approximately 2,600 deaths (including 343 firefighters and 71 law enforcement officers) were caused by fires that followed the crashes of jetliners into the World Trade Center towers in New York. At the Pentagon in Washington, DC, 125 people were killed by the plane crash and subsequent fire.
 2002Lagos armoury explosion caused fires in Northern Lagos, Nigeria, which killed at least 1,100 people.
 2002Edinburgh Cowgate fire, Scotland, 150 people fled their homes but there were no injuries.
 2002Rodeo–Chediski Fire
 2003Canberra bushfires killed 4 and destroyed over 500 homes
 2003Cedar Fire, San Diego, tenth-largest California brush fire that killed 15 and destroyed 2,232 homes.
 2007Greek forest fires destroyed 2,100 buildings.
 2008Camden Market Fire, which caused severe damage to one of North London's most famous shopping districts.
 2009February Black Saturday Bushfires in Victoria, Australia, resulted in 173 deaths

2010s 
 2010 2010 Thai political protests in Bangkok, burned BEC TV3, CentralWorld and many buildings.
 2010Dhaka fire kills 117 people in the Nimtali area of Old Dhaka, Bangladesh.
 2011Devastating fire in Manila, Philippines, leaves about 8,000 people homeless and 9 injured in a Makati  squatter community.
 2012Hurricane Sandy caused a six-alarm fire that destroyed 121 homes in Breezy Point, Queens, New York.
 2013Yarnell Hill Fire burned over 13 square miles, destroyed over 100 homes, and killed 19 firefighters.
 2013Lac-Mégantic derailment caused an explosion and fire in the town centre that destroyed over 30 buildings and killed 46. The event was the deadliest train accident in Canada since 1864.
 2013Boardwalk fire in Seaside Heights & Seaside Park, New Jersey, US.  At least 19 buildings destroyed, 30 businesses lost, no major injuries.
 2014Valparaíso wildfire devastated several areas of Valparaíso, Chile, destroying 2,500 homes and killing at least 15 people.
 2015Tianjin Port fire and explosions killed at least 173 people, damaged 300 buildings and over 10,000 vehicles.
 2016Fort McMurray wildfire in Alberta destroyed approximately 2,400 homes and buildings, and forced a complete evacuation.
 2016The Gatlinburg Fire began as a wildfire in the Great Smoky Mountains National Park, and spread into the town of Gatlinburg, Tennessee, killing 14.
2017 October 2017 Iberian wildfires. A fire started in Galicia, a province with high risk of wildfire and spread dangerously quick thanks to Hurricane Ophelia (2017) through Spain and Portugal.
2017In October, 17 separate fires raged across five counties in Northern California, causing extensive damage in Sonoma and Napa Counties.  The fires burned 160,000 acres, destroyed 5,700 buildings, and killed 43. The two largest fires were the Tubbs Fire and Atlas Fire. The city of Santa Rosa, California sustained heavy damage, with over 2,800 buildings destroyed.
2018Kemerovo fire at the Winter Cherry complex mall in Kemerovo, Russia, killed 60 people. The blaze started on the top floor of the four-story complex, and people were seen jumping from windows to escape it.
2018Camp Fire. California's deadliest and most destructive wildfire left at least 81 people dead and torched more than 152,000 acres. The fire burned through the towns of Paradise and Concow and other populated areas including Magelia, CenterVille and Butte Creek Canyons, and destroyed the historic Honey Run Covered Bridge, one of the last three-tier bridges that stood in the United States.
2018 Between July 23 and July 25 Greece experienced a national tragedy when a huge fire near Marathon in Attika killed 100 people. The inefficient fire service is said to have been a major factor for the disastrous outcome. The fire broke out in a nearby forest and quickly expanded to the surrounding towns.
2019Another Dhaka fire kills 78 people on February 20 in Churihatta, Chawkbazar area of old Dhaka, Bangladesh.

2020s 
2020 – The Almeda Drive Fire in Jackson County, Oregon burned down the towns of Talent and Phoenix.
2020 – The Beachie Creek Fire in Marion County, Oregon destroyed the towns of Detroit and Gates. The fire erupted due to historic winds causing downed powerlines throughout the Santiam Canyon on September 8, causing the death of 5 people.
2020 – Arson damage from 164 structure fires during the George Floyd protests in Minneapolis–Saint Paul resulted in one death.
2021 – The Lytton Creek Wildfire in Lytton, British Columbia burned the town of Lytton.
2021– The Caldor Fire That burned Grizzly Flats, California and Omo Ranch, California.
2021 – A fire broke out in the town of El Cayo on the cay of Bonacca which is part of an island named Guanaja. The fire injured 4 residents and destroyed more than 200 structures.
2021 – 50+ MPH winds blew the West Wind Fire into Denton, MT burning 25 homes and several other outbuildings including the town's grain elevators.
2021 – Over 1,000 homes burned, and at least one person died in Marshall, Superior and Louisville Colorado in the Marshall fire.

See also
List of fires
List of building or structure fires
List of transportation fires
List of forest fires
List of wildfires

Coal seam fire
Oil well fire

References

town and city